was a semi-legendary ruler of Okinawa Island. He was the founding monarch of the Eiso dynasty.

The name Eiso superficially looks like a temple name but the scholarly consensus is that it represents Iso (伊祖), a settlement in modern-day Urasoe, Okinawa. Wezo no ikusamoi (good commander of Iso), who appears in the archaic poem collection Omoro Sōshi, is usually identified as Eiso.

Life
According to Sai Taku's edition of the Chūzan Seifu (1701), Eiso was born as son of Eso Yononushi (恵祖世主), a descendant of the Tenson dynasty, who is said to have descended from the goddess of creation. The Chūzan Seikan (1650) is inconsistent about their relationship. The section of Gihon treats Eiso as the son of Eso Yononushi while the section of Eiso states that he was Eso Yononushi's grandson. The Chūzan Seikan claims that his mother gave birth after she dreamed of the Supreme Deity. The Chūzan Seifu is more explicit about the miraculous birth and is characterized by a cliché: She dreamed of the sun, from which pregnancy followed. When she gave birth, the room is said to have become filled with a mysterious light and extraordinary fragrance.

He served to King Gihon as Regent from 1235. During Gihon's reign, Okinawa suffered from famines and plague outbreaks. Gihon expressed his intention to abdicate, and his retainers recommended Eiso as successor to Gihon. As a result, he succeeded to the throne in 1260.

Eiso instituted a variety of tax and land reforms, and Okinawa recovered from famines and other problems which plagued the previous reign. Some northwestern islands, which Sai On's edition of the Chūzan Seifu (1725) identified as Kumejima, Kerama, and Iheya, paid tribute to the king for the first time in 1264. The Chūzan Seikan also claims that in 1266, Amami Ōshima sent envoys to pay tribute to the king. They needed a chain of interpreters for communication. He died in 1299 at the age of 71, and was succeeded by his son Taisei. He was interred at a mausoleum named Urasoe yōdore.

Introduction of Buddhism
The Ryūkyū-koku yurai-ki (1713) speculates that Buddhism was introduced to Okinawa during the reign of Eiso. A Buddhist monk named Zenkan drifted to Okinawa after carrying out Fudaraku tokai, a rare Japanese Buddhist ritual of setting out to sea in a boat in the hope of arriving at Potalaka. Eiso greeted Zenkan by building a temple named Zokuraku-ji. Locating in the west of Urasoe Castle, Zokuraku-ji survived to the reign of King Shō En, who after a fire, relocated the temple to the south of Urasoe Castle and renamed it to Ryūfuku-ji.

Invasions by the Yuan dynasty
Sai On's edition of the Chūzan Seifu (1725) claims that during the reign of Eiso, the Yuan dynasty tried to subjugate Ryukyu twice in 1292 and 1297. In 1292, the Yuan imperial court of Kublai Khan sent envoys demanding for Ryukyu to become a vassal of the empire. During the expedition, they arrived at an island where they got drawn into fighting with the islanders. As a result, they turned back without visiting Okinawa. In 1297, Kublai's successor, Temür Khan, sent a military force to invade Ryukyu. Because it encountered a fierce resistance, it made off with 130 Ryukyuan captives.

These episodes cannot be found in the Chūzan Seikan (1650) or Sai Taku's edition of the Chūzan Seifu (1701). In fact, it was Sai On who copied them from Chinese sources. Modern scholars generally consider that the Liuqiu (瑠求) in the Chinese sources referred to Taiwan, not Okinawa Island. In fact, the History of Yuan states that the Penghu Islands and Liuqiu faced each other and that the envoys of 1292 visited Penghu en route to Liuqiu.

Notes

1229 births
1299 deaths
Kings of Ryūkyū
13th-century Ryukyuan people